Eduan Raymond van der Walt (born 20 March 1987) is a South African rugby union footballer. He plays mostly as a lock and more recently represented the Pumas in the Currie Cup and Vodacom Cup having previously played for the Blue Bulls.

In 2013, he was included in a South Africa President's XV team that played in the 2013 IRB Tbilisi Cup and won the tournament after winning all three matches.

He was a member of the Pumas side that won the Vodacom Cup for the first time in 2015, beating  24–7 in the final. Van der Walt made seven appearances during the season.

References

External links

itsrugby.co.uk profile

Living people
1987 births
South African rugby union players
Rugby union locks
Rugby union players from Pretoria
Pumas (Currie Cup) players
Blue Bulls players